Patrick Woulfe was an Irish independent politician and solicitor. He was a member of Seanad Éireann from 1948 to 1951. He was nominated by the Taoiseach to the 6th Seanad in 1948. He did not contest the 1951 Seanad election.

References

Year of birth missing
Year of death missing
Independent members of Seanad Éireann
Members of the 6th Seanad
Nominated members of Seanad Éireann